Richard Dorill (c. 1719 – 1 January 1762) was a naval officer and colonial governor of Newfoundland, died in Bath, England.

Naval career
Dorill joined the Royal Navy in 1732 and was promoted to lieutenant in 1739. He served off Toulon in action against the French and Spanish in 1744. Promoted to captain he was given command of the sloop HMS Jamaica in 1746 and of the frigate HMS Penzance in 1755. He was appointed Governor of Newfoundland in May 1755. He upheld Britain's commands regarding its inhabitants and his intolerance of the Irish Catholic. He had a Roman Catholic priest arrested for officiating at mass in Harbour Grace. He went on to take command of the first-rate HMS Royal George at Deptford in 1756.

See also 
 Governors of Newfoundland
 List of people from Newfoundland and Labrador

References

External links
Biography at Government House The Governorship of Newfoundland and Labrador

1710s births
1762 deaths
Royal Navy officers
Governors of Newfoundland Colony
Royal Navy personnel of the War of the Austrian Succession
Year of birth uncertain